Uma Bharani is an Indian actress who acts prominently in Tamil and Malayalam films. After acting only in few films, she then started acting in Tamil serials. She is now a dubbing artist in Tamil movies and serials. Her mother was T. R. Latha, who was a famous stage actress. She started her film career in Aanandam Paramaanandam. She also gave voice to the Hindi dubbed Tamil blockbuster serial Sindhu Bhairavi (Uttaran in Hindi), which was telecast on Raj TV.  She gave voice to the character Sindhu (The lead role of this serial), also to Mahathi (Sindhu's daughter).

Filmography

As an actress

As a dubbing artist 
Tamil

Award 
1983 Best New Face Award – Panorama film festival (Veena Poovu (film))

Television 
Flight No.172 (Doordarshan)
Ladies Hostel
Solladi Sivasakthi
 Rail Sneham (Voice for heroine Raasi)
 Anbulla Amma (Voice for Meena)
 Shanthi (Voice for Mandira Bedi)
 Sindhu Bhairavi (Voice for Tina Dutta)

References

External links 

Actresses in Malayalam cinema
Indian film actresses
Actresses in Tamil cinema
Year of birth missing (living people)
Living people
Place of birth missing (living people)
20th-century Indian actresses
21st-century Indian actresses
Indian child actresses
Actresses in Telugu cinema
Indian voice actresses